Sir Maurice Garnier Hallett  (28 October 1883  30 May 1969) was a British administrator who served as governor of the United Provinces and of Bihar Province, collectively from 1936 to 1945.

He also served as commander-in-chief of the British Indian Army. He was among the other officials to formulate an action plan with Governor-General of India, Lord Linlithgow regarding the Khaksar movement and detention of Inayatullah Khan Mashriqi.

Biography 
He was born to John Thomas Hallett (1830–1915) and Caroline Maria (1841–1915) on 28 October 1883 at Priors Hardwick, Warwickshire. He had three siblings. His father was vicar of Priors Hardwick.

He received his education from the Winchester College and New College, Oxford. After completing his education, he joined the Imperial Civil Service in 1907.

Career
He was first appointed Magistrate and Collector in 1916. From 1920 to 1924, he served as Secretary to the government of Bihar Province, and later he was appointed Officiating Commissioner in 1929. He also served as Chief Secretary to the government of Bihar and Orissa from 1930 to 11 April 1933, and Home Secretary to the government of British India from 12 April 1933 until he was later appointed governor of Bihar from 1936 to 1937. Later, he served as sixth governor of the United Provinces from 7 December 1939 to 6 December 1945. Prior to his last appointment, he served as governor of the United Provinces for a period of five months from 17 May 1938 to 16 September 1938.

References

External links 
 

1883 births
1969 deaths
People from Warwickshire (before 1974)
People educated at Winchester College
Alumni of New College, Oxford
Indian Civil Service (British India) officers
Knights Grand Commander of the Order of the Star of India
Knights Commander of the Order of the Star of India
Companions of the Order of the Star of India
Place of death missing
British people in colonial India